USS LST-558 was a United States Navy tank landing ship in commission from 1944 to 1946.

LST-558 was laid down on 11 February 1944 at Evansville, Indiana, by the Missouri Valley Bridge and Iron Company. She was launched on 14 April 1944, sponsored by Mrs. Henry Goodman, and commissioned on 8 May 1944.

During World War II, LST-558 was assigned to the Pacific Theater of Operations and participated in the following operations:

Capture and occupation of southern Palau Islands — September and October 1944
Leyte landings — October and November 1944
Lingayen Gulf landing — January 1945
Zambales-Subic Bay — January 1945
Iwo Jima - Assault and occupation, 19 to 25 February 1945
Okinawa Gunto — April 1945

Following the war, LST-558 performed occupation duty in the Far East and saw service in China until early February 1946. She returned to the United States and was decommissioned on 13 February 1946 and struck from the Navy list on 16 September 1947. On 24 May 1948, she was sold to the Bethlehem Steel Company, of Bethlehem, Pennsylvania, for scrapping.

LST-558 earned four battle stars for her World War II service.

References

External links
  history.navy.mil: USS LST-558

LST-542-class tank landing ships
World War II amphibious warfare vessels of the United States
Ships built in Evansville, Indiana
1944 ships